This is a list of notable people buried in Glasnevin Cemetery.
 Thomas Ashe – died on hunger strike in 1917
 Kevin Barry – medical student executed for his role in the Irish War of Independence. (His body was moved from Mountjoy Prison to Glasnevin in 2001, having been accorded a state funeral.)
 Piaras Béaslaí – Easter Rising survivor turned writer
 Sir Alfred Chester Beatty – art collector
 Brendan Behan – author and playwright
 Professor Thomas Bodkin – lawyer, art historian, art collector and curator
 Harry Boland – friend of Michael Collins and anti-Treaty politician. 
 Christy Brown – writer of My Left Foot and subject of the film of the same name
 Father Francis Browne – Jesuit priest and photographer who took the last known photographs of RMS Titanic
 Cathal Brugha – first President of Dáil Éireann (January – April 1919) 
 Thomas Henry Burke – Permanent Under Secretary to Chief Secretary for Ireland Lord Frederick Cavendish, victim with his master of the Phoenix Park murders in 1882
 Sergeant James Byrne – Victoria Cross recipient (Indian Mutiny)
 Sir Roger Casement –  human rights campaigner turned revolutionary, executed by the British in 1916 2 
 Erskine Childers – Irish Nationalist and writer, executed by the Irish Free State government during the Irish Civil War. 
 Mary "Molly" Alden Childers – Irish Nationalist and wife of Erskine Childers
 J. J. Clancy – Irish Nationalist MP (1847–1928)
 Michael Collins – republican leader, Anglo-Irish Treaty signatory and first internationally recognised Irish head of government
 Dáithí Ó Conaill – a founder member of the Provisional Irish Republican Army
 Roddy Connolly – socialist politician and son of James Connolly
 Andy Cooney – Irish republican
 John Philpot Curran – patriotic barrister, renowned wit, lawyer on behalf of Wolfe Tone and other United Irishmen, Sarah Curran's father
Michael Cusack – founder of the Gaelic Athletic Association.
 William Dargan – Ireland's rail pioneer
Peggy Dell - Irish singer and pianist
 Charlotte Despard – suffragist
 Private Thomas Duffy – VC recipient (Indian Mutiny)
 Éamon de Valera – 3rd President of Ireland (1959–1973) and dominant Irish leader of 20th century
 Sinéad de Valera – wife of Éamon de Valera, buried in the same plot
 Anne Devlin  – famed housekeeper of Robert Emmet
 John Devoy – Fenian leader 
 John Blake Dillon – Irish writer and politician
 Martin Doherty – IRA member
 Frank Duff – founder of the Legion of Mary
 Edward Duffy – Irish Fenian, Irish Republican Brotherhood
 James Fitzmaurice – aviation pioneer
 Francis Gleeson – Chaplain to the British Army and the Irish Free State
 Edmund Dwyer Gray – Irish 19th century MP, son of Sir John Gray
 Sir John Gray – Irish 19th century MP. 
 Maud Gonne – nationalist campaigner, famed beauty and mother of Nobel and Lenin Peace Prize winner Seán MacBride, who is also buried in the grave 
 Arthur Griffith – President of Dáil Éireann (January – August 1922)
 Joseph Patrick Haverty – Irish painter
 Tim Healy – 1st Governor-General of the Irish Free State. 
 Denis Caulfield Heron – lawyer and politician
 Gerard Manley Hopkins – poet
 Peadar Kearney – composer of the Irish National Anthem, Amhrán na bhFiann
 Luke Kelly – singer and folk musician, founding member of The Dubliners
 Kitty Kiernan – fiancée of Michael Collins
 James Larkin – Irish trade union leader and founder of the Irish Labour Party, Irish Transport & General Workers Union (ITGWU) and Irish Citizen Army
 Richard Michael Levey – violinist, conductor, composer and music director at the Theatre Royal, Dublin
Josie MacAvin – Oscar- and Emmy-winning set decorator and art director
 Seán MacBride – founder of Clann na Poblachta and a founder-member of Amnesty International
 Edward MacCabe – late 19th century Cardinal Archbishop of Dublin and Primate of Ireland .
 Dick McKee – member of the Irish Republican Army during the War of Independence
 Terence MacManus – Irish rebel and shipping agent
 James Patrick Mahon – Irish nationalist politician and mercenary
 Countess Constance Markievicz – first woman elected to the British House of Commons and a minister in the first Irish government
 Manchester Martyrs – cenotaph honouring 3 members of the Irish Republican Brotherhood known in history as the Manchester Martyrs who were in fact buried in the grounds of a British prison following their execution
 Lance Corporal James Murray – VC recipient (First Boer War)
 Dermot Morgan – Irish satirist and star of Father Ted. Cremated in Glasnevin and interred at Deansgrange Cemetery.
 Kate Cruise O'Brien – writer and publisher (This is not Kate O'Brien who is buried in Faversham Cemetery, England.)
 Daniel O'Connell – Irish political leader from 1820s to 1840s.
 Patrick O'Donnell the Avenger – executed in 1883 in London for the assassination of the co-conspirator turncoat of the Phoenix Park murder, James Carey. A memorial in his honour stands in Glasnevin.
 Patrick Denis O'Donnell – Irish military historian, writer, and former UN peace-keeper
 Jeremiah O'Donovan Rossa – Fenian leader Patrick Pearse's oration at his funeral in 1915 has gone down in history.
 Eoin O'Duffy – Chief of Staff of the Irish Republican Army and leader of The Blueshirts
 Thomas O'Hagan, 1st Baron O'Hagan – Lord Chancellor of Ireland
 Kevin O'Higgins – assassinated Vice-President of the Executive Council
 Seán T. O'Kelly – 2nd President of Ireland (1945–1959)
 John O'Mahony – a founder of the Irish Republican Brotherhood
 Ernie O'Malley - anti-Treaty IRA leader during the Irish Civil War
 John O' Leary – an Irish republican and a leading Fenian.
 James O'Mara – nationalist leader and member of the First Dáil
 Henry O'Neill – painter and archaeologist
 Christopher Palles, Chief Baron of the Irish Exchequer, often described as "the greatest of Irish judges"
 Charles Stewart Parnell – dominant Irish political leader from 1875 to 1891
 Patrick (P.J.) Ruttledge – Minister in Éamon de Valera's early governments
 Daniel D. Sheehan – first independent Irish labour MP
 Hanna Sheehy-Skeffington – founder of Irish Women's Franchise League
 Sergeant Philip Smith – VC recipient (Crimean War)
 Chief Boatswain's Mate John Sullivan – Royal Navy VC recipient (Crimean War)
 Patrick James Smyth – journalist and politician
 David P. Tyndall – prominent Irish businessman who transformed the grocery business
 William Joseph Walsh – Roman Catholic Archbishop of Dublin
 Billy Whelan – Manchester United footballer who died in the Munich air disaster of 1958

References

External links
 Glasnevin Cemetery
 Glasnevin Cemetery: famous names at Find a Grave
 Companion sites: irishgraves.com and deadireland.com
 Burial Records from Glasnevin Cemetery at Interment.net

 
Dublin (city)-related lists